Pyrausta obscurior is a moth in the family Crambidae. It was described by Aristide Caradja in 1938. It is found in Yunnan, China.

References

Moths described in 1938
obscurior
Moths of Asia